Jake Wingfield (born 1 August 2001) is an English professional rugby league footballer who plays as a  forward  for St Helens in the Betfred Super League.

Background
Wingfield signed from Blackbrook ARLFC and came through the Saints scholarship programme. He also spent 2014 to 2016 with the Penrith Panthers.

Career
Wingfield made his first team début for St Helens as a  against the Salford Red Devils on 26 Oct 2020. Due to end-of-season fixture congestion caused by the COVID-19 pandemic, Saints fielded a very young side, resting the majority of first team players, in preparation of their derby match against the Wigan Warriors just four days later.  On 24 September 2022, Wingfield played for St Helens in their 2022 Super League Grand Final victory over Leeds.
On 18 February 2023, Wingfield played in St Helens 13-12 upset victory over Penrith in the 2023 World Club Challenge.

References

External links
St Helens profile

2001 births
Living people
English rugby league players
Leigh Leopards players
Rugby league players from St Helens, Merseyside
Rugby league second-rows
St Helens R.F.C. players